This is a list of destinations that Sun Country Airlines currently serves as of November 2021. Charter destinations are not included.

Destinations

References

External links 
Sun Country Airlines

Lists of airline destinations